Edita Šujanová (born 23 May 1985) is a Czech basketball player who competed in the 2008 Summer Olympics.

References

1985 births
Living people
Czech women's basketball players
Olympic basketball players of the Czech Republic
Basketball players at the 2008 Summer Olympics
People from Vyškov
Sportspeople from the South Moravian Region